Beale Piano is a brand of pianos which was formerly manufactured in Sydney, Australia.

History

Establishment of piano importing business
Octavius Beale established a business to import pianos and sewing machines in Sydney in 1884. He imported German upright pianos, of which a few survive todaythese are known as "Habsburg Beale". At that time, it was common practice to import German made pianos and attach local branding.

Prior to establishing this business, Beale had been involved with Hugo Wertheim in a piano and sewing machine importing business in Melbourne. These pianos are worth restoring and preserving and represent the beginnings of modern piano manufacture in Australia.

Australia's first piano manufacturer
In 1893, Beale established Australia’s first piano factory in Sydney. In 1902, Beale opened a new factory at Annandale, which went on to become the largest piano factory in the southern hemisphere and the British Empire in the early 1900s.

Beale introduced the all-iron tuning system, for which a patent was granted in 1902. This tuning system was referred to in earlier Beale pianos as the "Beale-Vader tuning system".

Also, Beale focused on making pianos with local timbers and sought to make pianos which were suited to the changeable Australian climate.

The Beale factory was self-contained and made every element of the pianos, resulting in a broad range of trades working to produce instruments.

Activities conducted in the factory included:

 Brass and iron foundries 
 Timber works, including drying kilns, manufacture of veneers, joinery and cabinetry 
 Paint and pattern shops 
 Machining and electroplating 
 Keyboard action-making and fitting 
 Tuning and intoning 
 Polishing rooms 
 Experimental laboratories

The business continued to operate after Octavius Beale’s death in a car accident in 1930.

Contribution to Australia's War effort
During World War II, production of pianos was suspended to make way for the manufacture of wooden parts for de Havilland Mosquito aircraft.

Post War resumption of production
After World War II, Beale recommenced production of pianos. The business was sold to  Paling & Co. in 1961.

Impact of social change
Social change and the availability of cheap imports led to the decline in demand for pianos. In particular, the availability of recorded music and later the introduction of radio and television, heralded significant change in the pattern of social life in Australia and resulted in a decline in piano-playing.

Cessation of Australian production
Production of pianos in Australia ceased in 1975. It is estimated that Beale produced 95,000 pianos in Australia.

Beale pianos today
The Beale brand is now applied to pianos which are manufactured in China.

Legacy
While Australia no longer mass-produces pianos, there are two Australian manufacturers of very high quality grand pianosOvers and Stuart and Sons. Their pianos present a showcase for Australian piano manufacturing. Overs pianos are pianos built by other makers which Overs redesigns and improves tonally and sometimes structurally depending on the make, age and client's order and budget. A third maker Mr. Court had built some pianos in Darwin in the last twenty years.

See also
Australian piano manufacturers

Historic:
 Wertheim Piano

Current:
 Stuart and Sons

External links
 History of Beale pianos and Serial Number List - from the Overs Piano website 
 National Library of Australia article regarding historic Beale Piano advertising catalogues
 Australian Dictionary of Biography Online entry for Octavius Beale

Australian companies established in 1884
Piano manufacturing companies
Manufacturing companies based in Sydney
Musical instrument manufacturing companies of Australia